The 1976 East Carolina Pirates football team was an American football team that represented East Carolina University as a member of the Southern Conference during the 1976 NCAA Division I football season. In their third season under head coach Pat Dye, the team compiled a 9–2 record.

Schedule

Roster

References

East Carolina
East Carolina Pirates football seasons
Southern Conference football champion seasons
East Carolina Pirates football